Shwe Kyar Phoo Thit is a 2018 Burmese drama television series. It aired on MRTV-4, from February 15 to April 4, 2018 on Monday to Friday at 19:00 for 34 episodes.

Cast
Mone as Shwe Kyar Phoo Thit
Yan Aung as Aphoe
Zu Zu Zan as Aphwar
Ye Aung as U Pyae Shan
Lin Myat as Ko Ko
Thi Ha as Min Nyo
Shinn Myat as Mg Mg Latt
Aung Khaing as U Aung Naing
Kaung Sit Thway as Tay Zar Lin
Hazel Nyi Nyi Htun as Wadi

References

Burmese television series
MRTV (TV network) original programming